"Panini" is a song by American rapper Lil Nas X from his second EP 7 (2019). It was released as his second single through Columbia Records on June 20, 2019. "Panini" was written by Lil Nas X, alongside production duo Take a Daytrip and co-producer Dot Da Genius. Late singer & Nirvana frontman Kurt Cobain is also credited as a writer due to the chorus containing an interpolation of the band's song "In Bloom" from their album Nevermind.

Mike Diva directed the "Panini" music video starring Skai Jackson. Premiering on September 5, 2019, it features her trying to outrun Lil Nas X and choreographed robots in a futuristic setting. A remix with American rapper DaBaby was released on September 13, 2019.

Background
"Panini" was released by Columbia Records as Lil Nas X's second single on June 20, 2019, one day before the release of 7. Multiple music publications wrote that the chorus of the song contains an interpolation of "In Bloom", released on the 1991 album Nevermind by Nirvana and written by frontman Kurt Cobain. Lil Nas X, however, stated that the similarity between the two songs' melodies was unintentional, as he was not introduced to the band's music until after recording "Panini". Nevertheless, he later thanked Cobain's daughter, Frances Bean Cobain, for being able to interpolate "In Bloom". "Panini" is named after the fictional cabbit bear hybrid of the same name—a character from the animated television series Chowder with the character herself being named after the Panini sandwich.
It is composed in the key of F minor and employs common time meter. The synth-driven ostinato simulates the timbre of a brass instrument and implies a v-VI harmonic progression with the tonic chord momentarily bridging the other two and effectively behaving as a passing tone; a similar approach is likewise found in Toto's hit "Africa".

Critical reception 
Beatriz da Costa of Vibe said the track felt like "a distant cousin to Travis Scott's tasty hits", and called the track "short and enjoyable". Rosalind Faulkner of NPR said that the track and Lil Nas X proved that "he can be more than a one-hit wonder."

Accolades

Music video
Mike Diva directed the music video for "Panini" starring Skai Jackson. It premiered on September 5, 2019. The video features her trying to outrun Lil Nas X and choreographed robots in a futuristic Tokyo setting. It makes use of several lights, holograms and advertisements; along with floating billboards and flying cars.

Stereogums Tom Breihan compared the visuals to the 1982 film Blade Runner, interpreting them as "a sort of parody of what it's like to have a song that's suddenly inescapable, and for what it's like when other people have to deal with that omnipresence". Kristin Corry of Vice similarly wrote that the video could be taken metaphorically, "because his presence in it is similar to the mega-success of the ubiquitous 'Old Town Road' this summer". Writing for Vulture, Zoe Haylock praised the video by stating that its art department and visual effects team deserve "an Academy Award? Nobel Prize?".

Remix/Alternate music video
About a week after the "Panini" music video, the DaBaby remix of "Panini" with an animated unofficial video on Lil Nas X's YouTube channel was released on September 13, 2019, with characters from the Cartoon Network animated series, Chowder due to the fact that a character from Chowder has the name of "Panini". The animated music video was animated and directed by Emonee Larussa, and also co-animated by Joey Prosser, Chaz Bottoms, and Fifthpower. C. H. Greenblatt, the creator of Chowder was not involved in the production of the music video, though he praised it on his Tumblr blog.

Credits and personnel
Credits adapted from Tidal.
 Lil Nas X – lead vocals, songwriting
 Take a Daytrip – production, songwriting
 Dot da Genius – co-production, songwriting
 Kurt Cobain – songwriting
 Thomas Cullison – assistant engineering
 Denzel Baptiste – recording
 DJ Swivel – mixing
 Colin Leonard – mastering
 DaBaby – featured vocals, songwriting

Charts

Original version

Weekly charts

Year-end charts

Certifications

Release history

References

External links
 
 

2019 songs
2019 singles
Columbia Records singles
Lil Nas X songs
Songs about fictional male characters
Songs about fictional female characters
Songs written by Kurt Cobain
Songs written by Lil Nas X
Chowder (TV series)
DaBaby songs
Animated music videos
Songs written by Dot da Genius
Song recordings produced by Take a Daytrip